Foreground detection is one of the major tasks in the field of computer vision and image processing whose aim is to detect changes in image sequences. Background subtraction is any technique which allows an image's foreground to be extracted for further processing (object recognition etc.).

Many applications do not need to know everything about the evolution of movement in a video sequence, but only require the information of changes in the scene, because an image's regions of interest are objects (humans, cars, text etc.) in its foreground. After the stage of image preprocessing (which may include image denoising, post processing like morphology etc.) object localisation is required which may make use of this technique.

Foreground detection separates foreground from background based on these changes taking place in the foreground. It is a set of techniques that typically analyze video sequences recorded in real time with a stationary camera.

Description
All detection techniques are based on modelling the background of the image, i.e. set the background and detect which changes occur. Defining the background can be very difficult when it contains shapes, shadows, and moving objects. In defining the background it is assumed that the stationary objects could vary in color and intensity over time.

Scenarios where these techniques apply tend to be very diverse. There can be highly variable sequences, such as images with very different lighting, interiors, exteriors, quality, and noise. In addition to processing in real time, systems need to be able to adapt to these changes.

A very good foreground detection system should be able to:
 Develop a background (estimate) model.
 Be robust to lighting changes, repetitive movements (leaves, waves, shadows), and long-term changes.

Background subtraction
Background subtraction is a widely used approach for detecting moving objects in videos from static cameras. The rationale in the approach is that of detecting the moving objects from the difference between the current frame and a reference frame, often called "background image", or "background model". Background subtraction is mostly done if the image in question is a part of a video stream. Background subtraction provides important cues for numerous applications in computer vision, for example surveillance tracking or human pose estimation.

Background subtraction is generally based on a static background hypothesis which is often not applicable in real environments. With indoor scenes, reflections or animated images on screens lead to background changes. Similarly, due to wind, rain or illumination changes brought by weather, static backgrounds methods have difficulties with outdoor scenes.

Temporal average filter

The temporal average filter is a method that was proposed at the Velastin. This system estimates the background model from the median of all pixels of a number of previous images.
The system uses a buffer with the pixel values of the last frames to update the median for each image.

To model the background, the system examines all images in a given time period called training time. At this time we only display images and will find the median, pixel by pixel, of all the plots in the background this time.

After the training period for each new frame, each pixel value is compared with the input value of funds previously calculated. If the input pixel is within a threshold, the pixel is considered to match the background model and its value is included in the pixbuf. Otherwise, if the value is outside this threshold pixel is classified as foreground, and not included in the buffer.

This method can not be considered very efficient because they do not present a rigorous statistical basis and requires a buffer that has a high computational cost.

Conventional approaches
A robust background subtraction algorithm should be able to handle lighting changes, repetitive motions from clutter and long-term scene changes. The following analyses make use of the function of V(x,y,t) as a video sequence where t is the time dimension, x and y are the pixel location variables. e.g. V(1,2,3) is the pixel intensity at (1,2) pixel location of the image at t = 3 in the video sequence.

Using frame differencing 
A motion detection algorithm begins with the segmentation part where foreground or moving objects are segmented from
the background. The simplest way to implement this is to take an image as background and take the frames obtained at the time
t, denoted by I(t) to compare with the background image denoted by B. Here using simple arithmetic calculations, we can
segment out the objects simply by using image subtraction technique of computer vision meaning for each pixels in I(t), take the
pixel value denoted by P[I(t)] and subtract it with the corresponding pixels at the same position on the background image
denoted as P[B].

In mathematical equation, it is written as:
 

The background is assumed to be the frame at time t. This difference image would only show some intensity for the pixel locations which have changed in the two frames. Though we have seemingly removed the background, this approach will only work for cases where all foreground pixels are moving and all background pixels are static. A threshold "Threshold" is put on this difference image to improve the subtraction (see Image thresholding).

 

This means that the difference image's pixels' intensities are 'thresholded' or filtered on the basis of value of Threshold.
 The accuracy of this approach is dependent on speed of movement in the scene. Faster movements may require higher thresholds.

Mean filter 
For calculating the image containing only the background, a series of preceding images are averaged. For calculating the background image at the instant t,

 

where N is the number of preceding images taken for averaging. This averaging refers to averaging corresponding pixels in the given images. N would depend on the video speed (number of images per second in the video) and the amount of movement in the video. After calculating the background B(x,y,t) we can then subtract it from the image V(x,y,t) at time t = t and threshold it. Thus the foreground is

 

where Th is a threshold value. Similarly we can also use median instead of mean in the above calculation of B(x,y,t).

Usage of global and time-independent thresholds (same Th value for all pixels in the image) may limit the accuracy of the above two approaches.

Running Gaussian average 
For this method, Wren et al. propose fitting a Gaussian probabilistic density function (pdf) on the most recent  frames. In order to avoid fitting the pdf from scratch at each new frame time , a running (or on-line cumulative) average is computed.

The pdf of every pixel is characterized by mean  and variance  . The following is a possible initial condition (assuming that initially every pixel is background):

 

 

where  is the value of the pixel's intensity at time . In order to initialize variance, we can, for example, use the variance in x and y from a small window around each pixel.

Note that background may change over time (e.g. due to illumination changes or non-static background objects). To accommodate for that change, at every frame , every pixel's mean and variance must be updated, as follows:

 

 

 

We can now classify a pixel as background if its current intensity lies within some confidence interval of its distribution's mean:

 

 

where the parameter  is a free threshold (usually  ). A larger value for  allows for more dynamic background, while a smaller  increases the probability of a transition from background to foreground due to more subtle changes.

In a variant of the method, a pixel's distribution is only updated if it is classified as background. This is to prevent newly introduced foreground objects from fading into the background. The update formula for the mean is changed accordingly:

 

where  when  is considered foreground and  otherwise. So when  , that is, when the pixel is detected as foreground, the mean will stay the same. As a result, a pixel, once it has become foreground, can only become background again when the intensity value gets close to what it was before turning foreground. This method, however, has several issues: It only works if all pixels are initially background pixels (or foreground pixels are annotated as such). Also, it cannot cope with gradual background changes: If a pixel is categorized as foreground for a too long period of time, the background intensity in that location might have changed (because illumination has changed etc.). As a result, once the foreground object is gone, the new background intensity might not be recognized as such anymore.

Background mixture models 
Mixture of Gaussians method approaches by modelling each pixel as a mixture of Gaussians and uses an on-line approximation to update the model. In this technique, it is assumed that every pixel's intensity values in the video can be modeled using a Gaussian mixture model. A simple heuristic determines which intensities are most probably of the background. Then the pixels which do not match to these are called the foreground pixels.
Foreground pixels are grouped using 2D connected component analysis.

At any time t, a particular pixel's history is

 

This history is modeled by a mixture of K Gaussian distributions:

 

where

 

First, each pixel is characterized by its intensity in RGB color space. Then probability of observing the current pixel is given by the following formula in the multidimensional case

Where K is the number of distributions, ω is a weight associated to the ith Gaussian at time t and µ, Σ are the mean and standard deviation of said Gaussian respectively.

Once the parameters initialization is made, a first foreground detection can be made then the parameters are updated. The first B Gaussian distribution which exceeds the threshold T is retained for a background distribution

The other distributions are considered to represent a foreground distribution. Then, when the new frame incomes at times , a match test is made of each pixel. A pixel matches a Gaussian distribution if the Mahalanobis distance

Then, two cases can occur:

Case 1: A match is found with one of the k Gaussians. For the matched component, the update is done as follows

Power and Schoonees [3] used the same algorithm to segment the foreground of the image

Case 2: No match is found with any of the  Gaussians. In this case, the least probable distribution  is replaced with a new one with parameters

Once the parameter maintenance is made, foreground detection can be made and so on. An on-line K-means approximation is used to update the Gaussians. Numerous improvements of this original method developed by Stauffer and Grimson have been proposed and a complete survey can be found in Bouwmans et al. A standard method of adaptive backgrounding is averaging the images over time, creating a background approximation which is similar to the current static scene except where motion occur.

Surveys 
Several surveys which concern categories or sub-categories of models can be found as follows:

MOG background subtraction  
 Subspace learning background subtraction 
 Statistical background subtraction 
 Fuzzy background subtraction 
 RPCA background subtraction (See Robust principal component analysis for more details)
 Dynamic RPCA for background/foreground separation   (See Robust principal component analysis for more details)
 Decomposition into low-rank plus additive matrices for background/foreground Separation   
 Deep neural networks concepts for background subtraction 
 Traditional and recent approaches for background subtraction

Applications 

 Video surveillance
 Optical motion capture
 Human computer interaction
 Content-based video coding
 Traffic monitoring
 Real-time motion gesture recognition

For more details, please see

See also 
3D data acquisition and object reconstruction
Gaussian adaptation
Region of interest
Teknomo–Fernandez algorithm
ViBe

References

Comparisons
Several comparison/evaluation papers can be found in the literature:
A. Sobral, A. Vacavant. "A comprehensive review of background subtraction algorithms evaluated with synthetic and real videos". Computer Vision and Image Understanding, CVIU 2014, 2014.
A. Shahbaz, J. Hariyono, K. Jo, "Evaluation of Background Subtraction Algorithms for Video Surveillance", FCV 2015, 2015.
 Y. Xu, J. Dong, B. Zhang, D. Xu, "Background modeling methods in video analysis: A review and comparative evaluation', CAAI Transactions on Intelligence Technology, pages 43–60, Volume 1, Issue 1, January 2016.

Books  
 T. Bouwmans, F. Porikli, B. Horferlin, A. Vacavant, Handbook on "Background Modeling and Foreground Detection for Video Surveillance: Traditional and Recent Approaches, Implementations, Benchmarking and Evaluation", CRC Press, Taylor and Francis Group, June 2014. (For more information: http://www.crcpress.com/product/isbn/9781482205374)
 T. Bouwmans, N. Aybat, and E. Zahzah. Handbook on Robust Low-Rank and Sparse Matrix Decomposition: Applications in Image and Video Processing, CRC Press, Taylor and Francis Group, May 2016. (For more information: http://www.crcpress.com/product/isbn/9781498724623)

Journals 
T. Bouwmans, L. Davis, J. Gonzalez, M. Piccardi, C. Shan, Special Issue on "Background Modeling for Foreground Detection in Real-World Dynamic Scenes", Special Issue in Machine Vision and Applications, July 2014.
A. Vacavant, L. Tougne, T. Chateau, Special section on "Background models comparison", Computer Vision and Image Understanding, CVIU 2014, May 2014.
A. Petrosino, L. Maddalena, T. Bouwmans, Special Issue on "Scene Background Modeling and Initialization", Pattern Recognition Letters, September 2017.
 T. Bouwmans, Special Issue on "Detection of Moving Objects", MDPI Journal of Imaging, 2018.

Workshops  
Background Learning for Detection and Tracking from RGB videos (RGBD 2017) Workshop in conjunction with ICIAP 2017. (For more information: http://rgbd2017.na.icar.cnr.it/)
Scene Background Modeling and Initialization (SBMI 2015) Workshop in conjunction with ICIAP 2015. (For more information: http://sbmi2015.na.icar.cnr.it/)
IEEE Change Detection Workshop in conjunction with CVPR 2014.  (For more information: http://www.changedetection.net/)
Workshop on Background Model Challenges (BMC 2012) in conjunction with ACCV 2012. (For more information: http://bmc.iut-auvergne.com/)

Contests  

IEEE Scene Background Modeling Contest (SBMC 2016) in conjunction with ICPR 2016 (For more information: http://pione.dinf.usherbrooke.ca/sbmc2016/)

External links 
Background subtraction by R. Venkatesh Babu
Foreground Segmentation and Tracking based on Foreground and Background Modeling Techniques by Jaume Gallego
Detecció i extracció d’avions a seqüències de vídeo by Marc Garcia i Ramis

Websites  
 Background Subtraction website

The Background Subtraction Website (T. Bouwmans, Univ. La Rochelle, France) contains a comprehensive list of the references in the field, and links to available datasets and software.

Datasets 
 ChangeDetection.net (For more information: http://www.changedetection.net/)
 Background Models Challenge (For more information: http://bmc.iut-auvergne.com/)
 Stuttgart Artificial Background Subtraction Dataset (For more information: http://www.vis.uni-stuttgart.de/index.php?id=sabs )
 SBMI dataset (For more information: http://sbmi2015.na.icar.cnr.it/)
 SBMnet dataset (For more information: http://pione.dinf.usherbrooke.ca/dataset/)

Libraries 
 BackgroundSubtractorCNT
The BackgroundSubtractorCNT library implements a very fast and high quality algorithm written in C++ based on OpenCV. It is targeted at low spec hardware but works just as fast on modern Linux and Windows. (For more information: https://github.com/sagi-z/BackgroundSubtractorCNT).

 BGS Library
The BGS Library (A. Sobral, Univ. La Rochelle, France) provides a C++ framework to perform background subtraction algorithms. The code works either on Windows or on Linux. Currently the library offers more than 30 BGS algorithms. (For more information: https://github.com/andrewssobral/bgslibrary)

 LRS Library – Low-Rank and Sparse tools for Background Modeling and Subtraction in Videos The LRSLibrary (A. Sobral, Univ. La Rochelle, France) provides a collection of low-rank and sparse decomposition algorithms in MATLAB. The library was designed for motion segmentation in videos, but it can be also used or adapted for other computer vision problems. Currently the LRSLibrary contains more than 100 matrix-based and tensor-based algorithms. (For more information: https://github.com/andrewssobral/lrslibrary)
 OpenCV – The OpenCV library provides a number background/foreground segmentation algorithms.

Telecommunications